Jag Huang (born 13 May 1981) is a Taiwanese actor, screenwriter and acting coach who began his career in theater. He is known for starring in the television series Wake Up.

Personal life 
Huang married actress Tsai Hsuan-yen in 2012. Tsai gave birth to their first child, a girl, in the same year.

Filmography

Film

Television

Music video

Theater

Awards and nominations

References

External links 

 
 

1981 births
Living people
Taiwanese male television actors
Taiwanese male film actors
Taiwanese male stage actors
21st-century Taiwanese male actors
Taipei National University of the Arts alumni
Taiwanese acting coaches